Country Songs for City Folks is the fifth studio album by Jerry Lee Lewis released on the Smash label in 1965.

Background
After leaving Sun Records in 1963 for Smash, Lewis embarked on what is often referred to as his "wilderness years," characterized by constant touring and periodic recording dates that produced  albums which failed to make any significant impact in the charts. In 1965, producers Shelby Singleton and Jerry Kennedy opted to cut a country-themed album on Lewis under the title Country Songs for City Folks, although the title was about as far as the concept went; the songs were straight forward readings of recent chart hits that featured Lewis's trademark piano style and soulful singing. In the early 1960s, country stars such as Marty Robbins, who released Gunfighter Ballads and Trail Songs in 1959, and Lewis's fellow Sun contemporary Johnny Cash, who began recording a string of themed albums beginning with Ride This Train in 1960, had pioneered the "concept album" in country music, and this approach was taken with Lewis.

Recording
As Joe Bonomo observes in his book Jerry Lee Lewis: Lost and Found, part of the reason for the lack of original tunes on the album was that "Jerry Lee's iffy chart life had had the predictable consequence of few songwriters knocking on his door," and that the collection of recent hits "infused the album with a contemporary feel, but underscored the crass 'covers' feel of the enterprise."  Nonetheless, the album foreshadows Lewis's re-emergence as a country megastar later in the decade, as he gives committed readings to songs from a genre that he had demonstrated a mastery of when he took "You Win Again" to number 4 in 1957. Country Songs for City Folks might be best remembered for introducing Welshman and Lewis fan Tom Jones to the song "Green Green Grass of Home"; after hearing Jerry Lee's rendition, he rushed into the studio and recorded his own version, which became an international hit.

Jerry Lee's younger sister Linda Gail Lewis sings on the Gold-rush saga "North to Alaska".

Reception

Country Songs for City Folks did not crack the Billboard chart, although it did rise to number 39 on the country albums chart when it was released again under the title All Country in the wake of Lewis's comeback four years later. Bruce Eder of AllMusic calls it "an astoundingly good country album," singling out the performances on Willie Nelson's "Funny How Time Slips Away" and Hank Thompson's honky-tonk lament "The Wild Side of Life."  In 2009, biographer Joe Bonomo observed that the lesser tracks on the album betray Smash's conservatism, citing the "innocuous folk-pop" of "Walk Right In" and "King of the Road" and the "superfluous" versions of "Ring of Fire" and a third recording of "Crazy Arms."  In 2014, Lewis admitted to biographer Rick Bragg, "That was a hangup for me, tryin' to do a song that's already been a multimillion seller. You don't tackle somethin' like that. That wasn't Jerry Kennedy's fault. That was my fault. I said, 'I wanna do 'Detroit City.'  'Cause I can beat the original on it.'"

Track listing
Side A

Side B

References

1965 albums
Jerry Lee Lewis albums
Albums produced by Shelby Singleton
Smash Records albums